Langenfeld may refer to the following places in Germany:

 Langenfeld, Bavaria, in the Neustadt (Aisch)-Bad Windsheim district of Mittelfranken, Bavaria 
 Langenfeld, Mayen-Koblenz, in the Mayen-Koblenz district of Rhineland-Palatinate
 Langenfeld, Rhineland, in the Mettmann district of North Rhine-Westphalia

See also 
 Lengenfeld near Zwickau in Saxony